The Chilaw Marians Cricket Club Ground, also known as the FTZ Sports Complex, or Free Trade Zone Sports Complex, is a cricket ground in Katunayake, Sri Lanka. It has hosted both first-class and List A cricket matches in domestic cricket tournaments in Sri Lanka. In August 2018, it was named as the venue to host some of the matches between Sri Lanka women and India women for their tour in September 2018.

References

Cricket grounds in Sri Lanka
Sport in Sri Lanka
Multi-purpose stadiums in Sri Lanka